Remote infrastructure management (RIM) is the remote management of information technology (IT) infrastructure. This can include the management of computer hardware and software, such as workstations (desktops, laptops, notebooks, etc.), servers, network devices, storage devices, IT security devices, etc. of a company.

Major sub-services included in RIM are:
 Service desk / Help desk
 Proactive monitoring of server and network devices
 Workstation management
 Server Management 
 Storage management
 Application support
 IT security Management and database management.

See also 
 Remote monitoring and management 
 Network monitoring
 Network performance management
 Systems management
 Comparison of network monitoring systems

References 

Computer networking
System administration